Benoordenhout is a neighbourhood in the Haagse Hout district of The Hague. In addition to Benoordenhout, Haagse Hout consists of the Bezuidenhout, Mariahoeve en Marlot, and Haagse Bos neighbourhoods.

Benoordenhout is located northeast of the city centre and is enclosed by the Koningskade, Raamweg, the Hubertuspark, the barracks and dunes north of the Waalsdorperweg, the city's border with Wassenaar, the Haagse Bos (The Hague Woods) and Malieveld.

The neighbourhood gets its name from the Haagse Bos. In Dutch, 'Benoorden' means 'situated north of' and 'hout' is an archaic term for forest. In modern Dutch, 'hout' solely refers to the material wood.

Benoordenhout is in turn divided into seven areas: the Nassaubuurt, Uilennest, Duinzigt, Waalsdorp, Arendsdorp, Clingendael and the area around the exclusive Van Hoytemastraat shopping street.

History
The Benoordenhout was built almost completely during the twentieth century. Few buildings existed before 1900, the most notable being the buildings in Clingendael and Arendsdorp. As can be seen on historical maps  only the area between Koningskade and Jan van Nassaustraat, in today's Nassaubuurt, had residential buildings.

By 1920, some buildings had been added, including the Shell headquarters at the Carel van Bylandtlaan. Between 1920 and 1940, houses were built up to the Alkemadelaan and the Waalsdorperweg, and in Duinzigt even beyond the Alkemadelaan. With the German invasion in 1940, construction stopped; only a few buildings were added, most notably the Julianakazerne barracks. Unlike in the Bezuidenhout, the damage resulting from the war was limited.

Uilennest was completed after the war. The sixties and seventies saw the construction of the eastern part of Duinzigt, the Bronovo hospital, the Nebo nursing home, and the ANWB headquarters. The zoo, which had been closed since 1943, made way for the building of the provincial administration in 1968.

Gallery

See also
Neuhuyskade

References

External links
 

Neighbourhoods of The Hague